Lithoglyphus apertus is a species of freshwater snail with an operculum, an aquatic gastropod mollusk in the family Lithoglyphidae.

Distribution 
The distribution of Lithoglyphus apertus includes rivers and sea-related areas near the northern Black Sea.

The type locality is "in der Save bei Agram in Croatien", which means in the Sava River near Zagreb, Croatia.

References

External links 

Lithoglyphidae
Gastropods described in 1852